Duel is a 1944 Soviet crime drama film directed by Vladimir Legoshin.

Plot 
The film takes place during the Great Patriotic War. The Red Army receives a new gun: "L-2", which was invented by the engineer Leontiev. He also has to test weapons on the front. German intelligence wants to acquire these weapons at any cost.

Starring 
 Sergei Lukyanov as Secret Service Col. Lartsev
 Vladimir Belokurov as Peter Weininger, aka Petrov, aka Petronescu
 Andrey Tutyshkin as The Captive Boris Leontyev
 Nadezhda Borskaya as Mariya Zubova (as Natasha Borskaya)
 Nina Alisova as Natalya Osenina
 Nadir Malishevsky as Capt. Bakhmetyev
 Aleksey Gribov as The Commissar of the Secret Service
 Omar Abdulov as Gestapo Col. Kraschke
 Anna Zarzhitskaya as Tonya, spy
 Irina Mesnonkina as Irina, spy

References

External links 
 

1944 films
1940s Russian-language films
Soviet crime drama films
1944 crime drama films
Soviet black-and-white films